Vladimir Korotkov successfully defended his title, defeating Brian Fairlie in the final, 6–3, 11–9 to win the boys' singles tennis title at the 1966 Wimbledon Championships.

Draw

Finals

Top half

Bottom half

References

External links

Boys' Singles
Wimbledon Championship by year – Boys' singles